Gilbertiodendron preussii is a species of tree in the family Fabaceae, native to tropical rain forests in West Africa. It is commonly known as the Liberian red oak.

Description
The timber is used for construction, flooring and railway sleepers. It is also used for making canoes, furniture, tool handles and joinery.

References

preussii
Flora of Liberia